Mars 1M No.2,  designated Mars 1960B by NASA analysts and dubbed Marsnik 2 by the Western media, was a spacecraft launched as part of the Soviet Union's Mars programme, which was lost in a launch failure in 1960. 1M No.2, which was intended to explore Mars from flyby trajectory, was destroyed after its Molniya carrier rocket failed to achieve orbit.

Launch 
Mars 1M No.2 was the second Mars 1M spacecraft to be launched, lifting off four days after its sister craft, Mars 1M No.1, had been lost during the Molniya 8K78 rocket's maiden flight. 1M No.2 was carried by another Molniya, which had the serial number L1-5M. The launch took place from Site 1/5 at the Baikonur Cosmodrome, with liftoff occurring at 13:51:03 UTC on 14 October 1960.

During preparations for the launch, an oxidiser leak in the second stage caused liquid oxygen, at cryogenic temperature, to spill around the engine's fuel inlet valve. This froze the stage's RP-1 propellant, leaving the engine unable to ignite. As a result, the spacecraft failed to achieve Earth orbit.

Scientific Instruments 
The spacecraft carried three scientific instruments in order to investigate Mars. They are as follows

 Ultraviolet Spectrometer
 Radiation Detector
 Cosmic-ray Detector

See also

 List of missions to Mars
List of Mars landers
List of artificial object on Mars
List of human mars missions

References

1960 in the Soviet Union
Spacecraft launched in 1960
Satellite launch failures
Mars program
Space accidents and incidents in the Soviet Union